Pselliophora flavibasis, the white crane fly, is a species of crane fly.

References

Tipulidae
Diptera of Asia
Insects described in 1916